Human origins may refer to::
 Anthropogeny, the study of human origins
 Creation myth, a symbolic narrative of human origins
 Human evolution, the phenotypic history of the genus Homo
 Monogenism, a theory of human origins
 Polygenism, a theory of human origins
 Recent African origin of modern humans, location related human origins
 Multiregional origin of modern humans, multi-location related human origins